The rufous-faced warbler (Abroscopus albogularis) is a species of the bush warbler family, Cettiidae. It was formerly included in the "Old World warbler" assemblage.

It is found in Bangladesh, Bhutan, China, India, Laos, Myanmar, Nepal, Taiwan, Thailand, and Vietnam. Its natural habitat is subtropical or tropical moist lowland forest.

References

rufous-faced warbler
Birds of Bhutan
Birds of South China
Birds of Myanmar
Birds of Northeast India
Birds of Laos
Birds of Taiwan
Birds of Vietnam
Birds of Yunnan
rufous-faced warbler
Taxonomy articles created by Polbot